Hugh John Connell DSO, MC & Bar (12 June 1884 – 31 January 1934) was an Australian politician from the Labor Party and a soldier who served in World War I.

Early life
Connell was born in the Sydney suburb of Woollahra, New South Wales and educated at Woollahra and Paddington public schools, Fort Street High School and at a teachers' training college. He taught at state schools in Sydney (1900–1905), Golgolgon and Tarcoon (1905–1908), Broken Hill and nearby Alma (1908–1910). As a result of criticism of employers during the 1909 lockout, he was transferred to Goulburn. He then taught at Howell (near Guyra), the Newcastle suburb of Wickham and the Sydney suburb of Burwood (1910–1915) and finally at the Newcastle suburb of Carrington.

Military service
Connell served from the outbreak of World War I in military training and in 1916 joined the First Australian Imperial Force as a lieutenant in the 35th Battalion and was promoted to captain in May 1916. He was awarded a Military Cross at the Battle of Messines in 1917. He received a bar to his Military Cross during the German Spring Offensive of 1918. He retired in 1919 as a major.

Political career

In 1920, Connell was elected as a Labor Party member for Newcastle in the New South Wales Legislative Assembly from 1920 to 1927. In 1927 he was elected to the seat of Kahibah and on its abolition in 1930, he was elected as the member for Hamilton, which he held until his death in the Newcastle suburb of Merewether.

Honours
Connell received a Distinguished Service Order in 1917, Military Cross in 1916 and bar in 1917, and was twice mentioned in despatches.

Notes

Members of the New South Wales Legislative Assembly
Companions of the Distinguished Service Order
1884 births
1934 deaths
Recipients of the Military Cross
Australian military personnel of World War I
Australian schoolteachers
Australian Labor Party members of the Parliament of New South Wales
20th-century Australian politicians